Harvey Leonard Sussmann  (known professionally as Harve Mann) is an American entertainer and songwriter.  

Mann is best known as “The Lounge Singer" character” on The David Letterman Show and as the opening act and musical director for Tiny Tim.

Background
Born in Philadelphia, Harve's mother was Paula Mann, a pianist and entertainer. As a child, he displayed a versatile voice, the ability to play piano by ear and instantly memorize songs.  He was soon performing with his mother at clubs. The first instrument he took up seriously was the guitar.

At age 11, Mann wrote his first songs and at age 15, he started singing professionally with various bands. His first TV appearance was on Philadelphia channel WCAU’s  Think Young program, where he played upright bass in a jazz trio.

As an adult, Mann was the lead male singer of a Las Vegas show group, then as part of The Harve and Charee Show then finally as a solo act. He performed with Rudy Vallee, Frank Fontaine, Jay Leno, Terri Garr, Bobby Breen and other show biz legends. In 1977, Mann's play, "Straighter Than You Think" was produced at the Keyboard Theatre in San Francisco.

After performing in Las Vegas from 1999 to 2005, Mann moved back to Los Angeles to continue recording and performing his music. In 2001 his abstract art appeared in several art shows in Los Angeles.

Music
Mann's satirical songs have been performed on The Dr. Demento Show. His romantic and spiritual songs have been recorded by artists such as Karen Young. Mann has recorded 23 albums of original songs mostly singing and playing all the parts himself. His music was featured in the George Van Noy film Dangerous Ideas (2009). In the Next Life, an album by Tiny Tim and Harve Mann, features several of his songs, including "Perhaps in the Next Life" and "Haribee". It was produced with Justin Martell, author of the book Eternal Troubadour: The Improbable Life of Tiny Tim (London, UK: 2016) which contains moments of Mann's work and friendship with Tiny. Mann appears in the film King for a Day by Johan von Sydow along with Weird Al Yankovitz, Tommy James and others.

Merrill Markoe, the original head writer for The David Letterman Show, described one of Mann's performances as her number two favorite moment from the show. During these performances, Mann, previously hired to sing special lyrics written for show's theme, serenaded the audience with some new lyrics. He is also mentioned in her book Here's the Kicker (Cincinnati, Ohio 2009).

References

http://www.drdemento.com/playlists/drd91.0407.html

1948 births
Living people
American male singer-songwriters
American singer-songwriters